Elphège Gravel (October 12, 1838 – January 28, 1904) was a Canadian Roman Catholic priest and the 1st Bishop of Nicolet, Québec from 1885 to 1904.

References
 

1838 births
1904 deaths
19th-century Roman Catholic bishops in Canada
20th-century Roman Catholic bishops in Canada
Roman Catholic bishops of Nicolet